Qeshlaq Rural District is a rural district (dehestan) in the Central District of Khorrambid County, Fars Province, Iran. At the 2006 census, its population was 3,524, in 836 families.  The rural district has 6 villages.

References 

Rural Districts of Fars Province
Khorrambid County